Phlebocarya is a genus of herbs in the family Haemodoraceae, first described as a genus in 1810. The entire genus is endemic to the southwestern part of Western Australia.

 Species
 Phlebocarya ciliata R.Br. 
 Phlebocarya filifolia (F.Muell.) Benth.
 Phlebocarya pilosissima (F.Muell.) Benth.

References

Haemodoraceae
Commelinales genera
Endemic flora of Australia
Flora of Western Australia